Sirukalathur is a village in the Sendurai taluk of Ariyalur district, Tamil Nadu, in India.

Demographics 

As per the 2001 census, Sirkalathur had a total population of 3617 with 1817 males and 1800 females.

References 

Villages in Ariyalur district